Anders Mikael Palmér (born 24 April 1960) is a Swedish former footballer who played as a midfielder.

During his career he played for Malmö FF and Vancouver Whitecaps FC. He earned 12 caps for the Sweden national football team between 1983 and 1987. Today he is a youth coach at Malmö FF. He also competed in the men's tournament at the 1988 Summer Olympics.

Personal life 
Palmér is the son of former professional footballer Karl-Erik Palmér who scored three goals for Sweden at the 1950 FIFA World Cup where Sweden finished third.

Honours
Malmö FF
Swedish Champion: 1986, 1988

References

External links

1960 births
Living people
Swedish footballers
Sweden international footballers
Allsvenskan players
Malmö FF players
Trelleborgs FF players
Association football midfielders
Olympic footballers of Sweden
Footballers at the 1988 Summer Olympics
Swedish expatriate footballers
Expatriate soccer players in Canada
Swedish expatriate sportspeople in Canada